Pakathon is a Boston-based, registered global non-profit organization with eight global chapters in four countries: Pakistan, the United States, Canada, and Australia. Founded in 2013, Pakathon aims to create jobs through innovation and entrepreneurship by mobilizing the Pakistani diaspora. By working to foster a global network of like-minded individuals, investors and entrepreneurs, Pakathon aims to solve problems in sectors such as education, healthcare, gender equality, energy and law.

Introduction 
The organization's flagship event is a weekend-long hackathon hosted in chapter cities where students and professionals develop and pitch their projects to a panel of mentors. Top-performing teams are then invited to present their ideas to a global audience where they compete for funding, mentorship, and additional support, with the aim of advancing their ideas from conception to reality. Two winning teams are then selected: one from Pakistan and another from the international host cities.

In 2015, Pakathon partnered with the Higher Education Commission of Pakistan to expand Pakathon's innovation-centred programming in up to 50 Pakistani universities.

Impact 
Pakathon's first winning team conceived the idea for ProCheck, a serialization system for authentic medicines in Pakistan. ProCheck allows customers and patients to verify authentic medicines using their mobile phones via text messaging. In November, 2015 ProCheck partnered with Ferozsons Labs, a leading manufacturer of pharmaceuticals in Pakistan, to serialize 35 million units of medicine using ProCheck's track and trace solution. As a result, more than 50,000 patients across the country will be able to distinguish between genuine and counterfeit medicines.

References 

Technology organizations
Entrepreneurship organizations
Pakistani diaspora
Organizations based in Boston
Organizations established in 2013
2013 establishments in Massachusetts